Doxa Kranoula F.C. is a Greek football club, based in Kranoula, Ioannina.The colours of the team is orange, blue and white.

History 
Doxa Kranoula played in Delta Ethniki for 5 years.

Doxa Kranoula played in the Greek professional league (Football League 2) for the first time in its history during the 2009-10 season, after winning the 5th Group of the Delta Ethniki during 2008-09. The club achieved 66 points in 32 games and 19 account wins, 9 draws and 4 loss, leaving behind the Nafpaktiakos Asteras and Tilikratis FC.Kranoula relegated after 5 years in Football League 2. After winning the title in the local division, 2016–17, the club promoted to Gamma Ethniki again.

Honors

Domestic Titles and honors
 Epirus FCA Champions: 2
 2003-04, 2016–17
 Epirus FCA Cup Winners: 1
 2005-06
 Epirus FCA Super Cup Winners: 1
 2016-17

References

Football clubs in Epirus
Association football clubs established in 1971
1971 establishments in Greece